The Skull and Dagger Society is the oldest secret honor society at the University of Southern California. Cofounded in 1913 by Hallam H. Anderson and Cloyd H. Marvin, the Society is primarily for graduating seniors consisting of leaders, scholars, and student-athletes. Many great USC alumni have been members of the Skull and Dagger Society, though the identities of the members are kept a secret.

Membership in Skull and Dagger is highly selective and is offered to USC students and alumni who have demonstrated exceptional leadership, service, and achievement in their academic, personal, and professional lives. The society is known for its tradition of secrecy and discretion, and its members are sworn to keep the group's activities and identity confidential.

The Skull and Dagger Society is known for its involvement in many important USC events and traditions, such as the homecoming parade and the senior class gift. Members of the society also participate in community service projects and charitable activities, and many go on to achieve great success in a variety of fields after graduation.

Traditions

Pranks
Newly inducted members each year pull a prank on the University and the student body. In the past, members have pranked the school by announcing an on campus early screening of the Star Wars Episode I trailer, only to greet the hundreds of students lined up outside the auditorium with U-Haul trailer with a poster that read: "Star Wars Trailer--Episode 1."Another notable prank includes the Society's 1997 prank, where it staged a memorial for Traveler IV, the University's horse mascot. During the event, a trailer supposedly containing the replacement of Traveler IV arrived only to reveal a donkey, wrapped in a banner that read, "Traveler IV is alive. Don't you feel like an ass?" Recently, the Society has been criticized for its annual prank practice with opponents stating that some of the pranks "damage the trustworthiness and credibility of respected campus services."

Attire
On the day of the prank the newly initiated members reveal themselves wearing odd hats and tailcoats.

Dinner Dance
The Society hosts an annual dinner dance at an upscale venue for its new members.

Gifts to USC
Skull and Dagger has been known to make gifts to the University. In 1994, the Society donated "The Wall of Scholars" to honor students who have won national and international fellowships, as well as recipients of USC awards. In 2011, the Society embarked to restore the University's class marker tradition and has been donating class markers ever since.

Skull and Dagger Foundation Scholarships
The Skull and Dagger Foundation has established two scholarships in memory of former Permanent Masters of the Society. The first was established in 1989 and is named in memory of Dr. Kenneth Owler Smith, a professor of Journalism, who served as Permanent Master of the Society from 1983 until his death in 1988. The second was established in 2002 in memory of Dr. Harrison M. Kurtz, a professor of Biological Sciences, who served as Permanent Master from 1989 until his death in 2001. Both scholarships are awarded annually to the continuing USC students (graduate or undergraduate) who have demonstrated significant campus and/or community leadership.

Notable members
Notable members include:

Alumni
Matt Barkley
Neil Armstrong
Matt Barkley
Reggie Bush
Rick Caruso
Anthony Davis
Will Ferrell
Pat Haden
Larsen Jensen
Keyshawn Johnson
Herb Klein
Paul Krekorian
George Lucas
Bill Sharman
Brad Thor
Camille Vasquez
John Wayne
Jesse Williams
Gin D. Wong

Faculty

Richard Dekmejian
James G. Ellis
Hilton A. Green
Art Mazmanian
Steven B. Sample
Kevin Starr
Norman Topping
Marvalee Wake
Rufus B. von KleinSmid

See also
Collegiate secret societies in North America

References

Honor societies
Collegiate secret societies
University of Southern California
Student organizations established in 1913
1913 establishments in California